Alagonia was an ancient town of Messenia, south-east of Gerenia: north-east of which there was a temple of Bacchus and another of Minerva.

References

Cities in ancient Peloponnese
Ancient Messenia
Ancient Greek archaeological sites in Peloponnese (region)